Peter Shepherd III (born August 13, 1986) is a Canadian professional stock car racing driver. He is currently racing in the NASCAR Pinty's Series for Dave Jacombs Racing and in the APC Series in the #22 APC/Total Race Car].

Racing career
Shepherd started in go-karts and moved on to the Thunder Car division at Flamboro Speedway. He progressed from there to Late Model running in the ALSTAR Series and then into Super Late Models with OSCAAR. Shepherd eventually worked his way into Canada's top series CASCAR running a season and a half winning races along the way as well as Rookie of the year. His prowess drew the attention of NASCAR owner Jack Roush, who invited him to Roush Racing: Driver X, the audition that was held in 2005 and televised on the Discovery Channel.

Shepherd turned heads with a surprising performance, ending up as one of six finalists in the competition.

Roush then signed Shepherd to further development, first in the ARCA RE/MAX Series in the No. 39 car for the Daytona season opener, then in several races in the Craftsman Truck Series. Shepherd's series debut was at Memphis Motorsports Park on July 22, 2006; he finished 23rd. Shepherd made two more starts that year, 31st at Nashville Superspeedway and 18th at Las Vegas Motor Speedway.

In the 2007 season, Shepherd shared the No. 50 ride in the Craftsman Truck Series with T. J. Bell. Shepherd was later released from his development contract for lack of sponsorship. He currently runs in the NASCAR Canadian Tire Series part-time for his own team. He picked up his first win at Kawartha Speedway in September 2010. Shepherd continues to run part-time in 2011, and he picked up his first win of the season on July 27 in Saskatoon.

In 2018, Shepherd finally made his Xfinity Series debut at Iowa Speedway driving the No. 55 for JP Motorsports. He finished 31st with 15 laps down.

Motorsports career results

NASCAR
(key) (Bold – Pole position awarded by qualifying time. Italics – Pole position earned by points standings or practice time. * – Most laps led.)

Xfinity Series

Craftsman Truck Series

ARCA Re/Max Series
(key) (Bold – Pole position awarded by qualifying time. Italics – Pole position earned by points standings or practice time. * – Most laps led.)

References

External links
 

1986 births
Racing drivers from Ontario
Living people
NASCAR drivers
Canadian racing drivers
ARCA Menards Series drivers
RFK Racing drivers
USAC Silver Crown Series drivers